Frazer Smith, also known as Frazier Smith (born January 17, 1955), nicknamed "The Fraze", is an American radio personality, actor and stand-up comedian.

Early life
Smith was born in Detroit, Michigan.

Career 
Smith worked in Los Angeles at KROQ-FM from 1976 through 1979, KLOS from 1979 through 1984, KMET 1984 through 1986, KLSX 1986 through 1997, KLOS in 1997, and KRTH in 2002. He has played small roles in films and television shows and was one of the announcers on the TBS music video show Night Tracks from 1986 to 1988 and 1989 to 1991.

The debut of his manic show on KROQ-FM coincided with that station's rise playing what was then-new new wave music. His extended improvisational comedy based on a mythical lothario/detective was also heard on the sporadically-produced Hollywood Nightshift, which featured Phil Austin of the Firesign Theatre, as well as movie, TV actor and radio DJ, Michael C. Gwynne, who also ran the board and spun the records. There was never a script, contrary to popular reviews of the time. A 'topic' appeared spontaneously as the theme ran and announcer Laura Quinn got set to introduce 'the boys.'

For several years Smith, along with Peter "Crabman" Crabbe, made an annual tradition of offering an alternate audio commentary to television coverage of the famous Tournament of Roses Parade. Listeners would be told to tune in to Los Angeles television station KTLA, which was hosted by Stephanie Edwards and Bob Eubanks. Smith would tell viewers to turn down the television volume and turn up the radio to hear the comedy parody, which included discussing news themes from the past year and applying them to the floats. For example, the year of the O. J. Simpson slow-speed car chase, one of the floats was described as a reenactment of the event. Smith and Crabbe would also describe the passing bands while playing continuous looped marching band music.

Smith is noted for his KROQ-FM simulcasts of the 1978 World Series. He coined the phrase "Too hip, gotta go!" while at KLOS.

Smith also hosted the late night television show called Rock 'N' America, in 1984.

Filmography

Film

Television

References

External links 
 
 
 Examples of Smith's Power News items

American radio personalities
American stand-up comedians
American male television actors
American male film actors
1955 births
Living people